This is a list of the 201 accepted species in the genus Convolvulus.

Convolvulus species 

Convolvulus acanthocladus
Convolvulus aitchisonii
Convolvulus althaeoides – mallow bindweed, mallow-leaf bindweed
Convolvulus ammannii
Convolvulus angustissimus
Convolvulus argillicola
Convolvulus argyracanthus
Convolvulus argyrothamnos
Convolvulus arvensis – lesser bindweed, field bindweed, common bindweed, white convolvulus, creeping jenny, perennial morning glory
Convolvulus aschersonii
Convolvulus assyricus 
Convolvulus asyrensis 
Convolvulus aucheri 
Convolvulus austroafricanus 
Convolvulus bazmanensis 
Convolvulus × beguinotii
Convolvulus betonicifolius
Convolvulus bidentatus
Convolvulus bidrensis
Convolvulus boedeckerianus
Convolvulus boissieri
Convolvulus bonariensis
Convolvulus bullerianus
Convolvulus calvertii
Convolvulus canariensis
Convolvulus cantabrica
Convolvulus capensis
Convolvulus capitulifer
Convolvulus caput-medusae
Convolvulus carduchorum
Convolvulus carrii
Convolvulus cassius
Convolvulus cataonnicus
Convolvulus cephalopodus
Convolvulus cephalophorus
Convolvulus chilensis
Convolvulus chinensis
Convolvulus chondrilloides
Convolvulus clementii
Convolvulus cneorum – shrubby bindweed, silvery bindweed, silverbush
Convolvulus coelesyriacus
Convolvulus commutatus
Convolvulus crenatifolius
Convolvulus crispifolius
Convolvulus × cyprius
Convolvulus demissus
Convolvulus × despreauxii
Convolvulus divaricatus
Convolvulus dorycnium
Convolvulus dregeanus
Convolvulus dryadum
Convolvulus durandoi
Convolvulus elymaiticus
Convolvulus ensifolius
Convolvulus equitans – grey bindweed, Texas bindweed 
Convolvulus eremophilus
Convolvulus erinaceus
Convolvulus erubescens – blushing bindweed, pink bindweed, Australian bindweed
Convolvulus euphraticus
Convolvulus eyreanus
Convolvulus farinosus
Convolvulus fatmensis
Convolvulus fernandesii
Convolvulus floridus – guadil, morning-glory-tree, rhodium-wood
Convolvulus fractosaxosa – shingle convolvulus
Convolvulus fruticosus
Convolvulus fruticulosus
Convolvulus galapagensis
Convolvulus galaticus
Convolvulus galpinii
Convolvulus germaniciae
Convolvulus gharbensis
Convolvulus glaouorum
Convolvulus glomeratus
Convolvulus gortschakovii
Convolvulus gracillimus
Convolvulus graminetinus
Convolvulus grantii
Convolvulus grigorjevii
Convolvulus hamadae
Convolvulus hamrinensis
Convolvulus hasslerianus
Convolvulus hermanniae
Convolvulus hildebrandtii
Convolvulus hirsutiflorus
Convolvulus holosericeus
Convolvulus hystrix
Convolvulus incisodentatus
Convolvulus iranicus
Convolvulus jefferyi
Convolvulus jemensis
Convolvulus jordanensis
Convolvulus kilimandschari
Convolvulus koieanus
Convolvulus kossmatii
Convolvulus humilis
Convolvulus kotschyanus
Convolvulus krauseanus
Convolvulus kurdistanicus
Convolvulus laciniatus
Convolvulus lanatus
Convolvulus lanjouwii
Convolvulus lanuginosus
Convolvulus leiocalycinus
Convolvulus leptocladus
Convolvulus libanoticus
Convolvulus lilloi
Convolvulus lindbergii
Convolvulus lineatus
Convolvulus linoides
Convolvulus longipedicellatus
Convolvulus lopezsocasii
Convolvulus maireanus
Convolvulus mairei
Convolvulus massonii
Convolvulus mazicum
Convolvulus meonanthus
Convolvulus microcalyx
Convolvulus microsepalus
Convolvulus mollissimus
Convolvulus montanus
Convolvulus multifidus
Convolvulus namaquensis
Convolvulus natalensis
Convolvulus ocellatus
Convolvulus oleifolius
Convolvulus oppositifolius
Convolvulus oreophilus
Convolvulus oxyphyllus
Convolvulus oxysepalus
Convolvulus palaestinus
Convolvulus palustris
Convolvulus peninsularis
Convolvulus pentapetaloides
Convolvulus persicus
Convolvulus phrygius
Convolvulus pilosellifolius – soft bindweed
Convolvulus pitardii
Convolvulus × platigena 
Convolvulus prostratus
Convolvulus pseudocantabricus
Convolvulus × pseudocompactus
Convolvulus pseudoscammonia
Convolvulus pyrrhotrichus 
Convolvulus randii 
Convolvulus rectangularis 
Convolvulus recurvatus
Convolvulus remotus
Convolvulus reticulatus
Convolvulus rhyniospermus
Convolvulus rottlerianus
Convolvulus rottlerianus
Convolvulus rozynskii
Convolvulus rufescens
Convolvulus sabatius – blue rock bindweed, ground blue-convolvulus
Convolvulus sagittatus
Convolvulus sarmentosus
Convolvulus sarothrocladus
Convolvulus scammonia – scammony
Convolvulus schimperi
Convolvulus schirazianus
Convolvulus schulzei
Convolvulus scindicus
Convolvulus scoparius – lignum rhodium, rhodium-wood
Convolvulus scopulatus
Convolvulus secundus 
Convolvulus selloi
Convolvulus semhaensis
Convolvulus sericocephalus
Convolvulus sericophyllus
Convolvulus siculus
Convolvulus simulans
Convolvulus sinuatodentatus
Convolvulus socotranus
Convolvulus spicatus
Convolvulus spinifer
Convolvulus spinosus'Convolvulus stapfii'
Convolvulus stenocladus''''Convolvulus steppicolaConvolvulus subsericeusConvolvulus subspathulatusConvolvulus suendermanniiConvolvulus supinusConvolvulus tedmooreiConvolvulus thomsoniiConvolvulus thunbergiiConvolvulus trabutianusConvolvulus tragacanthoides Convolvulus tricolor – dwarf convolvulus, dwarf morning gloryConvolvulus truncatusConvolvulus tschimganicusConvolvulus tujuntauensisConvolvulus × turcicusConvolvulus turrillianusConvolvulus ulicinusConvolvulus urosepalusConvolvulus valentinusConvolvulus verdcourtianusConvolvulus verecundus – trailing bindweed, tussock bindweedConvolvulus vidaliiConvolvulus virgatusConvolvulus volleseniiConvolvulus volubilisConvolvulus waitaha – grass convolvulusConvolvulus wimmerensis Convolvulus xanthopotamicus''

References 

Convolvulus
Convolvulus